Perry Dean Rogers is an architectural firm based in Boston, Massachusetts. Founded in 1923 as Perry, Shaw & Hepburn, the firm became notable for its designs for educational institutions. The firm was responsible for the restoration of Colonial Williamsburg. The firm asserts their expertise in creating the context of university environment. Perry Dean Rogers recently completed designing an entire college campus, masterplan and the individual buildings for the Franklin W. Olin College of Engineering in Needham, Massachusetts. William G. Perry was also hired to transform the Endicott Estate into a Governor's Mansion.

Projects

 Colonial Wiliamsburg, including the Williamsburg Inn
 Saugus Iron Works National Historic Site
 Wellesley Science Center
 US embassy in Amman, Jordan
 US embassy in London
 Furman University, Greenville, South Carolina
 Library, Norwich University, Northfield, Vermont
 Beinecke Student Activities Village, Hamilton College, New York
 William M. Bristol Jr. Pool, Hamilton College, New York
 Seeley G. Mudd Chemistry Building at Vassar College
 Waidner-Spahr Library at Dickinson College in Pennsylvania
 Franklin W. Olin College of Engineering in Needham, Massachusetts
 Renovation of Alvar Aalto's Baker Dormitory at Massachusetts Institute of Technology
 Cambridge American Cemetery and Memorial a memorial for American World War II servicemen in Cambridgeshire, near Cambridge, England
 Governor's Palace in North Carolina
 Strawberry Bank, Portsmouth, New Hampshire

References

Further reading
 Generating Context: The Practice of Perry Dean Rogers & Partners by Michael J. Crosbie. Birkhäuser Basel; 1 edition (September 1, 2001) , 
 When Change Is Set in Stone : An Analysis of Seven Academic Libraries by Perry Dean Rogers and Partners. Crosbie, Michael J. (Author) Hickey, Damon Douglas (Author). Association of College & Research Libraries (February 2001). ,

External links
 Official website

Architecture firms based in Massachusetts
Companies based in Boston
Design companies established in 1923
1923 establishments in Massachusetts
Preservationist architects